Johann Gottfried Becker (7 October 1639 — 17 May 1711) was a Danish pharmacist. He served as court pharmacist for Frederick III and  opened the  Elephant Pharmacy on Købmagergade in Copenhagen in 1670.

Early life and education
Becker was born in Husum, the son of principal Gottfried Becker (1600–1652) by his first wife Elisabeth Ehrenreich (died 1645). He apprenticed as a pharmacist in Flensburg from 1655 and stayed there for six years. He then went on a study trip to Türol but returned to Denmark in 1664 where he stayed with his brother in Odense for about a year. He then went on another study trip to Germany, Italy and Vienna.

Career
In 1668 Becker was called home to Denmark to serve as court pharmacist for  Frederick III. He had been recommended for the position by Giuseppe Francesco Borri. On 15 May 1669, he was granted a license to open a new pharmacy in Copenhagen. He opened Elefant Apotek on Købmagergade on 21 March the following year. Becker also served as field pharmacist and accompanied the army to Scania in 1670.

Becker was recognized as an eminent chemist and carried out numerous scientific experiments in his laboratory, often in collaboration with Thomas Bartholin, who praises him in several of his publications.

He published Mithridaticum damocrateum in 1671 and Desriptio Theriacae coelestis in 1704, and contributed to Apotekertaksten in 1672.

In 1708, Becker passed his pharmacy on to his son Gottfried Becker (1681 — 1750). In 1740 he was appointed to assessor in Collegium medicum and in 1749 to kammerassessorer.

Personal life
 
Becker was engaged to Sophia Heerfordt, a daughter of royal pharmacist Christopher Heerfordt, but she died in 1670 shortly before the wedding. He married Sophie Iversdatter (Bath) on 11 December 1671 in Copenhagen. She was killed in the fire of Sophie Amalienborg on 19 April 1689.

He later married Helene Margrethe Munk (died 26 July 1725) on 1 May 1694.

Becker died in 1811 and is buried at St. Peter's Church. His widow married district governor (amtmand) Hans Seidelin in 1713.

References

External links

 Johann Gottfried Becker
 J. G. Becker (born1723(

Danish pharmacists
Danish chemists
1639 births
1711 deaths